The Porbandar–Muzaffarpur Express is an Express train belonging to Western Railway zone that runs between  and  in India. It is currently being operated with 19269/19270 train numbers on a bi-weekly basis.

Coach composition

The train has standard ICF rakes with max speed of 110 kmph. The train consists of 23 coaches:

 1 AC II Tier
 5 AC III Tier
 10 Sleeper coaches
 1 Pantry Car
 4 General
 2 Second-class Luggage/Parcel van

Service

19269/Porbandar–Muzaffarpur Express has an average speed of 53 km/hr and covers 2443 km in 46 hrs 30 mins.
19270/Muzaffarpur–Porbandar Express has an average speed of 53 km/hr and covers 2443 km in 46 hrs 30 mins.

Route and halts 

The important halts of the train are:

 
 
 
 
 (Ahmedabad)

Schedule

Rake sharing 

The train shares its rake with 12905/12906 Shalimar–Porbandar Superfast Express, 20937/20938 Porbandar–Delhi Sarai Rohilla Superfast Express and 19201/19202 Secunderabad–Porbandar Weekly Express.

Traction

Both trains are hauled by a Vatva Loco Shed-based WDM-3A diesel locomotive from Delhi to Porbandar and vice versa.

See also 

 Secunderabad–Porbandar Weekly Express
 Porbandar–Delhi Sarai Rohilla Superfast Express
 Shalimar–Porbandar Superfast Express

References

External links 

 19269/Porbandar–Muzaffarpur Express India Rail Info
 19270/Muzaffarpur–Porbandar Express India Rail Info

Transport in Porbandar
Transport in Muzaffarpur
Express trains in India
Rail transport in Bihar
Rail transport in Uttar Pradesh
Rail transport in Delhi
Rail transport in Haryana
Rail transport in Rajasthan
Rail transport in Gujarat
Railway services introduced in 2006